Renato Teixeira de Oliveira (born May 20, 1945) is a Brazilian singer-songwriter. He is a representative of sertanejo music and folk rock, linked to the caipira culture and dialect. Teixeira is the author of several hit songs including "Romaria", which was notably covered by Elis Regina in her eponymous 1977 album. Other hit songs by Teixeira were "Dadá Maria" (in duet with Gal Costa) and "Tocando em Frente" (in duet with Almir Sater), later sung also by Maria Bethânia. Teixeira won twice the Latin Grammy Award: in 2015 for Best Sertaneja Music Album, with Sérgio Reis, and in 2016, with Sater. His album +AR (with Sater) was ranked as the 44th  best Brazilian album of 2018 by the Brazilian edition of Rolling Stone magazine and among the 25 best Brazilian albums of the second half of 2018 by the São Paulo Association of Art Critics.

Discography
   1969 - Maranhão e Renato Teixeira
    1971 - Álbum de Família
   1973 - Paisagem
    1977 - Romaria
    1979 - Amora
    1980 - Garapa
    1981 - Uma Doce Canção
    1982 - Um Brasileiro Errante
    1984 - Azul
    1985 - Terra Tão Querida
    1986 - Renato Teixeira
    1990 - Amizade Sincera  
    1992 - Ao Vivo em Tatuí (with Pena Branca & Xavantinho)
   1995 - Aguaraterra (with Xangai)  
    1996 - Sonhos Guaranis  
    1997 - Um Poeta e Um Violão  
    1998 - Ao Vivo no Rio  
    2000 - Alvorada Brasileira (with Natan Marques)
    2000 - O Novo  Amanhecer (with Zé Geraldo)
    2002 - Cantoria  Brasileira
    2003 - Cirandas, Folias e Cantigas do Povo Brasileiro
    2004 - Renato Teixeira e Rolando Boldrin
    2007 - Ao Vivo No Auditório Ibirapuera
    2010 - Amizade Sincera (with Sérgio Reis)
    2015 - Amizade Sincera II (with Sérgio Reis)
    2016 - AR (with Almir Sater)

References

1945 births
Living people
Brazilian singer-songwriters
Sertanejo musicians
People from Santos, São Paulo
Latin Grammy Award winners
Latin music songwriters